UTC+08:45 is an identifier for a time offset from UTC of +08:45.

As standard time (Southern Hemisphere winter)
Principal town: Eucla

Oceania

Pacific Ocean

Australasia
Australia - Central Western Standard Time
 Western Australia
 Caiguna
 Cocklebiddy 
 Eucla
 Madura
 Mundrabilla
 South Australia 
 Border Village

Usage
UTC+08:45 is used as a time in Australia (Central Western Time, or CWT). It is used by some roadhouses along the Eyre Highway in Western Australia and South Australia. Although not legally defined by the state or federal governments, the boundaries where it commences and ends are clearly understood and recognised by the Shire of Dundas local government and are frequently shown on road maps of the area. Road signs at the western end of the time zone on the Eyre Highway advise travellers to reset their clocks by 45 minutes.

UTC+08:45 is used in 5 places in Australia, including Border Village in South Australia, as well as Cocklebiddy, Eucla, Madura and Mundrabilla in Western Australia. It runs from the border with South Australia to shortly east of Caiguna. It is included in the tz database with designator Australia/Eucla.

See also
UTC+09:45

References

External links
Find cities currently in UTC+08:45

UTC offsets
Time in Australia

es:Huso horario#UTC+08:45, H†
de:Zeitzonen_in_Australien#Anomalien